"Nobody's Love" is a song by American band Maroon 5, released through 222 and Interscope Records on July 24, 2020, as the second single from the band's seventh studio album Jordi. It is their first single without bassist Mickey Madden. The song was inspired by the COVID-19 pandemic and the George Floyd protests.

Peaking at number 41 on the Billboard Hot 100, it became their first single to fail to chart in the Top 40 since 2015's "Feelings" failed to chart altogether. However, the single became their seventh consecutive top-ten hit on Billboards Adult Top 40 chart and record-extending 26th overall.

The remix, a collaboration with Jamaican singer-songwriter Popcaan, was released on October 16, 2020.

Background
On July 20, 2020, Maroon 5 announced that "Nobody's Love" will be released at midnight on July 24, 2020. The band also unveiled the single's cover art, which shows a mysterious, vivid and colorful image of a woman looking at the ocean. This cover also has three different versions, all made in Technicolor and with a Smiley face logo.

The song was inspired by the George Floyd protests and the ongoing COVID-19 pandemic, according to Adam Levine, who said: "The entire process of perfecting this song was done with the whole world in mind. I'm hoping that "Nobody's Love" is a song that can give everyone a moment of peace and reflection during this unprecedented moment in our world's story. Whether you are an essential worker on the front lines, an outspoken citizen fighting for social justice, or just someone who needs a break to remember the potent power of love, this song is for everyone".

Music video
The music video for "Nobody's Love" premiered on YouTube, at midnight 12AM (EST) and was directed by David Dobkin. It was shot on the Apple iPhone and filmed in isolation in Los Angeles, California. The video features an alone Adam Levine, sitting in a wooden chair in a backyard at night and smoking a marijuana  cigarette. In a joint letter with ACLU, Maroon 5 explained the events in the video:

Lyric video
A lyric video of the song was released on August 26, 2020. The visual employs the same color-changing aesthetic of the single's cover art, with calming scenes of waves crashing against the coastline.

Live performances
On August 10, 2020, Maroon 5 performed "Nobody's Love" for the first time on The Late Show with Stephen Colbert (as part of #Play at Home series), with the band members playing instruments separately in their own homes while in quarantine.

Track listing

Digital download
"Nobody's Love" – 3:31

Digital download – Popcaan Remix
"Nobody's Love" (Popcaan Remix) – 3:33

Charts

Weekly charts

Year-end charts

Certifications

Release history

References

2020 singles
2020 songs
Maroon 5 songs
222 Records singles
Interscope Records singles
Music videos directed by David Dobkin
Songs written by Adam Levine
Songs written by Ryan Ogren
Songs written by Michael Pollack (musician)
Songs written by Jacob Kasher
Songs written by Stefan Johnson
Song recordings produced by the Monsters & Strangerz
Protest songs
Songs about drugs
Songs about the COVID-19 pandemic
Songs about George Floyd
Songs based on actual events
Animated music videos